The  is a Japanese trade union group, which is usually referred to as  in Japanese. It is affiliated to Zenroren (the National Confederation of Trade Unions), the second largest of Japan's three main trade union confederations.

History
Kenkoro was established in 1999, with the merger of the Construction and Rural and General Workers' Union, the All Japan Transport and General Workers' Union, and the All Japan National Railway Locomotive Engineers' Union.

References

External links
  

Trade unions in Japan
Trade unions established in 1999
1999 establishments in Japan